John Alexander (30 September 1686 – 1 November 1743) was an Irish Presbyterian minister.

Life
He was a native of Ulster, but connected with the Scottish noble family of the Alexanders, earls of Stirling, being the grandson of the first earl. He was educated at Glasgow, and settled in England. Wilson identifies him with the John Alexander who was a pupil of Isaac Noble and Congregationalist minister at Gloucester 1712–18. He was Presbyterian minister at Stratford-on-Avon, where he educated students for the ministry.

He afterwards moved to Dublin, where he was installed minister of Plunket Street Presbyterian congregation on 15 November 1730. He was moderator of the General Synod of Ulster, 1734, and died in Dublin on 1 November 1743 and was buried there. His family moved to Birmingham.

Works

He was a linguist and patristic scholar; he published The Primitive Doctrine of Christ's Divinity … in an Essay on Irenæus … 1727.

Family
He married Hannah Higgs (1704/5–1768), daughter of Rev. John Higgs of Evesham, on 8 August 1732.  He left two daughters Mary (1734), Hannah (1742) and two sons, John and Benjamin (1737–1768): the latter, was a doctor of medicine, and translated J. B. Morgagni's De Sedibus (The Seats and Causes of Disease, investigated by Anatomy, 1769).

References

DNB references
These references are found in the DNB article referred to above.

External links

Attribution

1686 births
1743 deaths
People from County Antrim
Irish Presbyterian ministers
Patristic scholars
Linguists from Ireland
Irish people of Scottish descent
Dissenting academy tutors